The Portland Choir & Orchestra (formerly the Portland Ensign Choir & Orchestra) is a non-profit musical organization that consists of 120 volunteer singers and 45 musicians from the Portland, Oregon metropolitan area.  Many members travel up to 100 miles to participate in rehearsals and performances.

Founded in 2005, the choir has performed many classical, folk, gospel, holiday and other traditional carols all across the Pacific Northwest.  From Vancouver, Washington, to Salem, Oregon, the Portland Choir & Orchestra has brought the joy of music to thousands of people.

The Portland Choir & Orchestra has performed with various guest artists, including Grammy nominated and acclaimed concert violinist Jenny Oaks Baker, Broadway performer Dallyn Vail Bailes, and Mormon Tabernacle Organist Clay Christiansen.  Local celebrities to lend their talents to the Choir & Orchestra include former Portland Trail Blazer announcer Bill Schonely, who helped narrate a special concert dedicated to the veterans of the United States Armed Services.

Performing two concerts each season, the Portland Choir & Orchestra's repertoire consists of Christmas and other Holiday favorites, as well as a Spring concert usually centered on either Easter or Memorial Day.  Dr. David Thomas is the Artist Director of the Portland Choir & Orchestra, with Dr. Edward Higgins serving as the Orchestra Director.

The Choir & Orchestra have performed in various concert halls, including the Newmark Theatre in Portland, Oregon, the Skyview Auditorium in Vancouver, Washington, Lincoln Hall on the campus of Portland State University, and the Rogers Music Center on the campus of Willamette University in Salem, Oregon.

The choir has performed the National Anthem for several Portland Trail Blazers games at the Moda Center (formerly the Rose Garden.) Attendees reported a reverence never before seen or heard during the National Anthem when the choir sang.

References 

2005 establishments in Oregon
Choirs in Oregon
Musical groups from Portland, Oregon
Musical groups established in 2005
Orchestras based in Oregon